Mayodistichona is a genus of tachinid flies in the family Tachinidae.

Distribution
Peru.

Species
M. facialis Townsend, 1928

References

Tachinidae
Diptera of South America